Bori may refer to:

Places 
Borim or Bori, a town in Goa, India
Bori, Benin, a town
Bori, Nagpur, a town in  India
Bori, Parbhani, a town in India
Bori City, a city in Nigeria
Loralai, also known as Bori, a city in Balochistan, Pakistan
Bori Wildlife Sanctuary in Madhya Pradesh, India

People 
Gábor Bori (born 1984), Hungarian footballer
Lucrezia Bori (1887–1960), Spanish opera singer
Pier Cesare Bori, (1937-2012), Italian professor

Other uses 
, a 2020 South Korean film
Bori (food), a dried lentil dumpling in Bengali cuisine
Bori people of Arunachal Pradesh, India
Bori language, spoken by the Bori people
Bori (religion), a Hausa possession cult, dance, and music tradition in West Africa
Bhandarkar Oriental Research Institute, known in short as BORI
Bori, an 1894 meteorite fall in India
Bori, a Slovenian tractor manufacturer

See also
Borie (disambiguation)
Bory (disambiguation)